Serhiy Hennadiyovych Zahynaylov (born 3 January 1991) is a Ukrainian professional footballer who plays as a centre-forward for Bayernliga Nord club Bayern Hof.

Football career
Zahynaylov is a product of Youth Sportive Schools in Kyiv Oblast, then he spent his career played for different Ukrainians club and in February 2015 signed a contract with Moldovan club Dacia Chișinău.

In summer 2022 he moved to Bayern Hof a club in Germany, that also acquired Vadym Zhuk from Desna Chernihiv.

Honours
Metalist Kharkiv
 Ukrainian Premier League: Runner-Up 2012–13 

Riga
 Latvian First League: 2018

References

External links
 
 
 

1991 births
Living people
People from Brovary
Ukrainian footballers
Ukraine youth international footballers
Association football forwards
FC Metalist Kharkiv players
FC Helios Kharkiv players
FC Nyva Ternopil players
MFC Mykolaiv players
FC Dacia Chișinău players
FC Torpedo-BelAZ Zhodino players
FC Naftovyk-Ukrnafta Okhtyrka players
CSF Bălți players
Riga FC players
PFC Sumy players
FC Atyrau players
FC Alians Lypova Dolyna players
SpVgg Bayern Hof players
Ukrainian First League players
Ukrainian Second League players
Ukrainian Amateur Football Championship players
Moldovan Super Liga players
Belarusian Premier League players
Kazakhstan Premier League players
Latvian Higher League players
Ukrainian expatriate footballers
Expatriate footballers in Moldova
Expatriate footballers in Belarus
Expatriate footballers in Kazakhstan
Expatriate footballers in Latvia
Expatriate footballers in Germany
Ukrainian expatriate sportspeople in Moldova
Ukrainian expatriate sportspeople in Belarus
Ukrainian expatriate sportspeople in Kazakhstan
Ukrainian expatriate sportspeople in Latvia
Ukrainian expatriate sportspeople in Germany
Sportspeople from Kyiv Oblast